S. ehrenbergi may refer to:

 Spalax ehrenbergi, a blind mole-rat
 Sporisorium ehrenbergi, a plant pathogen

See also

 S. ehrenbergii (disambiguation)